Valentina Ursu is a journalist from the Republic of Moldova. She is working for Radio Free Europe Chişinău, and serves on the Eurasia Regional Scout Committee representing the Organizația Națională a Scouților din Moldova.

Awards 
 Order of the Republic (Moldova) - highest state distinctions (2009)

References

External links 
 Biografia autorului
 Valentina Ursu

Living people
Moldovan journalists
Radio Free Europe/Radio Liberty people
Moldovan women journalists
Recipients of the Order of the Republic (Moldova)
Scouting in Moldova
Eurasia Scout Committee members
Year of birth missing (living people)